Sunday Night Productions is an American film and television production company founded by John Krasinski and Allyson Seeger in 2013. It is known for producing the television series Lip Sync Battle, Dream Corp LLC and Jack Ryan, the YouTube streaming news show Some Good News, and the feature-length films The Hollars, A Quiet Place, and 
A Quiet Place Part II.

History
In 2013, John Krasinski and Allyson Seeger formed Sunday Night Productions with Krasinski's money from The Office. In May 2014, Krasinski and Seeger produced his film The Hollars, which was acquired by Sony Pictures Classics. In September 2014, Krasinski would produce both Shawn Wines' law student turned garbage collection comedy, as well as Josh Siegal and Dylan Morgan's workplace/family hybrid through Sunday Night for NBC, but, there have been no further developments for both shows. In November 2015, it was announced that Krasinski and Seeger will co-produce Dream Corp, LLC with Stephen Merchant for Adult Swim. In September 2016, it was announced that Krasinski and Seeger will co-produce Alex Carter's adaptation of the My Bad Parent book and blog for Fox, but there have been no further developments since. In March 2017, it was announced that Krasinski and Seeger will co-produce the film A Quiet Place with Platinum Dunes for Paramount Pictures, with Krasinski also co-writing and directing.

Projects previously in and currently in development
In 2013, Krasinski sold a spec script to produce an action-adventure movie he wrote with Oren Uziel for Warner Bros. In April 2018, Krasinski and Platinum Dunes will produce the sci-fi thriller Life on Mars, based on a short story by Cecil Castellucci for Paramount. In May 2018, Sunday Night will produce Krasinski and Aaron Sorkin’s Chateut Marmont miniseries The Hotel on Sunset, for HBO. In July 2018, Sunday Night will co-produce a Marc Rich biopic with Matt Damon in talks to play Rich. On March 22, 2019, Sunday Night will produce the film adaptation of Rebecca Alexander’s memoir Not Fade Away for Annapurna Pictures along with David O. Russell, with Emily Blunt in talks to play Alexander. In November 2020, Krasinski will produce A Quiet Place: Day One that Jeff Nichols will write. In March 2021, Krasinski and Platinum Dunes will produce Natalie Erika James' psychological thriller Apartment 7A, for Paramount Players. More recently, the company signed a first look deal with Paramount.

Filmography

Films

In production

Films
 IF (with Paramount Pictures)
 The King of Oil (with Universal Pictures)
 Not Fade Away (with Annapurna Pictures)
 Life on Mars (with Paramount Pictures)
 Untitled action-adventure film (with Warner Bros. Pictures)
 A Quiet Place: Day One (with Paramount Pictures)
 Apartment 7A (with Paramount Players)

Television

Previously in development

Television
 The Hotel on Sunset (with Warner Bros. Television)

Awards and recognition

Critics' Choice Awards

Emmy Awards

Producers Guild of America Awards

Webby Awards

References

2013 establishments in California
American companies established in 2013
Companies based in Santa Monica, California
Entertainment companies based in California
Film production companies of the United States
Mass media companies established in 2013
Television production companies of the United States